Russell C. Fagg is an American attorney, former judge, and politician. A Republican, he served two terms in the Montana House of Representatives from 1991 to 1995. He succeeded Mary McDonough in the 89th district. Fagg was succeeded by Peggy Arnott.

Fagg was elected district judge in Yellowstone County, Montana in 1994. He defeated the incumbent, Russell Fillner. He retired in October 2017. Fagg was succeeded by Don Harris.  He was a candidate in the Republican primary for the 2018 U.S. Senate election in Montana.

Career
 Montana House of Representatives (1991—1995)
 District Judge for Yellowstone County, Montana (1995—2017)

References

External links
 
 Russell C. Fagg at Ballotpedia
 In the GOP U.S. Senate primary race, do Montana roots matter? (May 2018)

1960 births
Candidates in the 2018 United States Senate elections
Living people
Republican Party members of the Montana House of Representatives
Montana lawyers
Montana state court judges
Whitman College alumni
University of Montana alumni